Chloride channel, nucleotide-sensitive, 1A, also known as CLNS1A, is a human gene. The protein encoded by this gene is a chloride channel regulator.

References

External links
 

Ion channels